Geoffrey John Allardice (born 7 May 1967) is an Australian former cricketer and administrator, who served as the CEO and General Manager of Cricket for the International Cricket Council (ICC). He was made the acting CEO in March 2021, taking the role on in a full-time capacity from November 2021. In April 2022, the ICC appointed Wasim Khan as their General Manager, taking over from Allardice. He was also part of the selection panel to appoint officials for the 2015 Cricket World Cup.

Allardice played 14 first-class cricket matches for Victoria between 1991 and 1994.

References

1967 births
Living people
Australian cricketers
Victoria cricketers
Cricketers from Melbourne
Australian cricket administrators